Posyolok Mekhanizatorov is a rural locality (a settlement) in Muromsky District, Vladimir Oblast, Russia. The population was 2,227 as of 2010.

Geography 
Posyolok Mekhanizatorov is located 3 km north of Murom. Yakimanskaya Sloboda is the nearest rural locality.

References 

Rural localities in Muromsky District